Eglish St Patrick's is a Gaelic Athletic Association club based in the village of Eglish in County Tyrone, Northern Ireland.

Grounds
Eglish's main playing field is Fr Connolly Park named after a former Parish priest which was opened in 1964 with the pitch being resurfaced in 1997 and 2014. The sports hall was opened in 1984 with new changing rooms and gym being built in 2001.
The club's new football ground is named Pairc Chormaic after the late Eglish and Tyrone captain Cormac McAnallen which opened in 2012. Changing rooms were built in late 2016.

Notable players
Cormac McAnallen -  All-Ireland winner 2003, All-Ireland Minor winning captain 1998 and Tyrone captain
Conor McKenna - All-Ireland Minor Finalist 2013. Formerly played Australian rules football for Essendon in Melbourne

Honours
 Tyrone Senior Football Championship (1)
 1970
 Tyrone Intermediate Football Championship (2)
 1992, 1997
 Tyrone Junior Football Championship (1)
 1973
 Tyrone Senior Football League (1)
 1976

 Tyrone Intermediate Football League (3)
 2007, 2010, 2022

 Tyrone Minor Football Championship Grade 1 1989, 1996 & 1997 Grade 2 2007 & 2015
 Tyrone Minor Football League Grade 1 1996 & 1997
 Tyrone Under-16 Football Championship Grade 2 2009, 2013 & 2017
 Tyrone Under-16 Football Championship Grade 3 2015
 Tyrone Under-16 Football League Grade 3 2015

Camogie
Eglish camogie club were serial camogie champions of Tyrone and won Ulster camogie titles in Senior Club Camogie Champions in 1985, 1986. 1987 and 1991, the year they went on to contest the All-Ireland senior final against Mullagh. The Camogie club won their first Ulster title in 2015 since 1991 retaining the title in 2016. In 2016 Eglish reached the All Ireland Intermediate Final losing to Myshall, Carlow on a score line of 1-09 to 1-10.

Gaelic games clubs in County Tyrone
Gaelic football clubs in County Tyrone